Terra Losa is a mixed residential and commercial neighbourhood located in west Edmonton, Alberta, Canada.

It is bounded on the east by 170 Street, on the south by 95 Avenue, on the west by 178 Street, and on the north by 100 Avenue (west of 176 Street) and 99A Avenue (east of 176 Street).

Demographics 

Residential development 

Terra Losa is a newer neighbourhood with most residences being built between 1991 and 2001.

Almost three out of four residences (72%) are apartment style dwellings.  Approximately two out of three apartment dwellings are owner-occupied condominiums in low-rise buildings with fewer than five stories.  The remaining apartments are rented, with some rental units in low-rise buildings and some in taller buildings with five or more stories.  The remaining residences are row houses (19%) and duplexes Single-family dwellings are noticeably absent.

When all residences in the neighbourhood are considered, 93.5% of all residences in the neighbourhood are owner-occupied.

Household income 
Average household incomes in Terra Losa are comparable to, if slightly below, those in Edmonton.

Surrounding neighbourhoods

References

External links 
 Terra Losa Neighbourhood Profile

Neighbourhoods in Edmonton